Glandford (Letheringsett Road) is a  geological Site of Special Scientific Interest  west of Sheringham in Norfolk. It is a Geological Conservation Review site and it is in the Norfolk Coast Area of Outstanding Natural Beauty.

This site is important because it has mounds of gravel and till which can help to show whether the North Norfolk till plain is the result of Pleistocene glacial deposition or is the residue of the erosion of a former more extensive area of gravel.

The site is private land with no public access.

References

Sites of Special Scientific Interest in Norfolk
Geological Conservation Review sites